Bharath Institute of Higher Education and Research (BIHER) also known as Bharath Institute of Science and Technology (BIST), informally Bharath University, and formerly Bharath Engineering College is a private and deemed university and an Indian institute of higher education located in Chennai, the capital of Tamil Nadu, India. It is recognised by the University Grants Commission (UGC) and is accredited by the National Assessment and Accreditation Council (NAAC) with the highest grade of A. It is also approved by the All India Council for Technical Education (AICTE).

History
Bharath Institute of Higher Education and Research was founded in 1984 as Bharath Institute of Science and Technology by S. Jagathrakshakan. It is among the first autonomous engineering colleges in Tamil Nadu. It was first affiliated to Madras University followed by Anna University. The institute was awarded deemed university status in 2002 by the University Grants Commission in recognition of its academic excellence. Hence, the name was changed to Bharath Institute of Higher Education and Research. In September 2006, it was renamed as Bharath University per a decree issued by the University Grants Commission enabling deemed universities to include the word "university" in their names. In November 2017, it was again renamed as Bharath Institute of Higher Education and Research following a directive issued by University Grants Commission and an order by the Supreme Court of India to all the deemed universities in India.

Academics
The university offers undergraduate, postgraduate and doctoral programs in fields such as science, technology, engineering, medicine (including dentistry, physiotherapy and nursing), arts and management.

Awards

Bharath University has won awards in recognition of its academic and research excellence. A few are listed below.

It was awarded the "Best Private University of the Year" by World Education Congress for 2014.
The university was awarded the "Best Multi Stream University" in 2014 by ASSOCHAM.

Campuses

Bharath University has four campuses, three in Chennai and one in Puducherry. The details of the campuses and their departments are in the list below.

Bharath Institute of Science and Technology

This is the main campus of the deemed university which was established in 1984. It is in Chennai and was initially known as Bharath Engineering College. The name was changed to Bharath Institute of Higher Education and Research in 2002 when it attained deemed university status. In 2003, the college was again renamed as Bharath Institute of Science and Technology and brought under Bharath University with the other constituent colleges.

Departments:

Aeronautical Engineering
Aerospace Engineering
Automobile Engineering
Biomedical Engineering
Industrial Biotechnology
Architecture
Chemistry
Civil Engineering
Computer Application
Computer Science & Engineering
Electronics and Communication Engineering
Electrical and Electronics Engineering
Electronics and Instrumentation Engineering

Electronics and Telecommunication Engineering
English
Genetic Engineering
Information Technology
Mathematics
Management Studies
Mechanical Engineering
Mechatronics
Physics

Sree Balaji Medical College and Hospital

This college was established in 2004 and is in Chennai.

Departments:

Anesthesiology and Pain Clinic
Biochemistry
Chest & TB
Casualty (Accident & Emergency Medicine)
Cardiac Care Center
Community Medicine
Dermatology
ENT & Head Neck Surgery
Forensic Medicine and Toxicology
General Medicine
General Surgery
Microbiology

Neurology
Neuro Surgery
Obstetrics and Gynaecology 
Ophthalmology
Orthopaedics
Paediatrics
Pathology
Psychiatry
Pharmacology
Radiology & Imaging Sciences
Surgical Gastroenterology
Urology & Nephrology

College on the same campus:
Sree Balaji College of Nursing, Chennai (estd. 2007)

Sri Lakshmi Narayana Institute of Medical Sciences

This college was established in 2007 and is in Puducherry.

Departments:

Anaesthesiology
Anatomy
Biochemistry
Community Medicine
Dentistry
Dermatology
ENT
Forensic Medicine
General Medicine
General Surgery
Microbiology

Obstetrics & Gynaecology
Ophthalmology
Orthopaedics
Paediatrics
Pathology
Pharmacology
Physiology
Psychiatry
Radiology
TB & Chest

Sree Balaji Dental College and Hospital

This college was established in 2002 and is in Chennai.

Departments:

Oral Medicine & Radiology
Oral and Maxillofacial Pathology
Conservative Dentistry and Endodontics
Periodontics
Oral and Maxillofacial Surgery
Orthodontics
Pedodontics and Preventive Dentistry
Prosthodontics and Crown & Bridge
Anatomy

Pharmacology
Microbiology
Bio Chemistry
General Surgery
General Medicine
Physiology
Community Dentistry
Oral Pathology

College on the same campus:
Sree Balaji College of Physiotherapy, Chennai (estd. 2007)

Rankings

The National Institutional Ranking Framework has ranked Bharath Institute of Higher Education and Research 87 overall and 59 among universities in 2020.

See also

List of deemed universities
Deemed University

References

External links
Official website

Deemed universities in India
Universities in Chennai
Academic institutions formerly affiliated with the University of Madras
1984 establishments in Tamil Nadu
Educational institutions established in 1984